The 2016 Indian Super League Final was a football match between ATK and Kerala Blasters on 18 December 2016 at the Jawaharlal Nehru Stadium in Kochi, Kerala. It was the final match of the 2016 Indian Super League season, the third season of the Indian Super League. The match was the second time these two teams played against each other in the Indian Super League final, the previous one was when both sides met in the inaugural 2014 final. ATK won that final 1–0.

Kerala Blasters reached the finals after finishing the regular season in second place. ATK finished their regular season in fourth place. In the semi-finals, Kerala Blasters took on the Delhi Dynamos while ATK played against Mumbai City. ATK hosted Mumbai City in the first match of the finals at the Rabindra Sarobar Stadium. Helped by a brace from Iain Hume, ATK won the first leg 3–2. The team then secured their place in the final after a 0–0 draw in Mumbai. The Kerala Blasters hosted Delhi Dynamos in their first match of the finals at the Jawaharlal Nehru Stadium and won 1–0. In the second leg, the Blasters were defeated 2–1 and thus the score remaining 3–3 on aggregate the match went to a penalty shootout as away goal rule was not applicable in case of Indian Super League. The Kerala Blasters won the shootout 3–0 to qualify for the final.

Watched by a crowd of  54,146, the Kerala Blasters took the lead in the 37th minute through Mohammed Rafi. The Kerala Blasters lead only lasted for seven minutes before Henrique Sereno equalized for ATK. At halftime the score was 1–1. The second half did not see any goals scored and thus the match went into extra-time. The first half of extra-time was goalless and so was the second half. With the score still remaining1–1 after extra-time, the match went into penalties. 

Penalty shoot out drama saw Graham Stack saving the first shot for ATK which gave a temporary lead for Kerala but Ndyoe blasted the ball over the bar and finally Cédric Hengbart saw his shot getting saved by the trailing leg of ATK keeper Debjit Majumder, ATK won the shoot-out 4–3 as Jewel Raja scored the winning penalty and they won the Indian Super League Final for the second time in three seasons.

Match

References

2016
Final
2016–17 in Indian football
December 2016 sports events in India
Kerala Blasters FC matches
ATK (football club) matches
Indian Super League Final 2016